The Rural Museum, inaugurated in 1996, is an ethnological collection of farmsteads designed to teach how life has evolved in the field. The museum is located in the town of Palau-Sator (in the Baix Empordà region), annexed to Mas Pou Restaurant.

The Collection 
Traditional farming equipment and tools that were once utilized by local farmers are on display. The museum is built in a structure with a floor area of more than 500 m2, and it also features carriages, carts, and ancient trades. Additionally, there is a part devoted to chores and things that were traditionally found in a conventional rural farmhouse's kitchen, bedroom, barn, cellar, and other rooms.

References

External links 
 Baix Empordà Tourism - Museums

Museums in Baix Empordà
Agriculture museums in Spain